William Fred Chapman (July 17, 1916 – March 27, 1997) was a professional baseball player. He played parts of three seasons in Major League Baseball, from 1939 until 1941, for the Philadelphia Athletics, primarily as a shortstop.

External links

Major League Baseball shortstops
Philadelphia Athletics players
Albany Senators players
York White Roses players
Trenton Senators players
Springfield Nationals players
Toronto Maple Leafs (International League) players
Wilkes-Barre Barons (baseball) players
Atlanta Crackers players
Landis Spinners players
Elkin Blanketeers players
Mooresville Moors players
Statesville Blues players
Baseball players from North Carolina
1916 births
1997 deaths